East Essex, formally known as the East Division of Essex was a parliamentary constituency in the English county of Essex.  From 1868 to 1885, it returned two Members of Parliament (MPs) to the House of Commons of the Parliament of the United Kingdom, using the bloc vote system of election.

Creation, boundaries and abolition
East Essex was created by the Reform Act 1867 for the 1868 general election as one of three two-member divisions of Essex (East, South and West), replacing the two divisions which had been created by the Reform Act 1832 (Northern and Southern). Initially named as the North East Division, it was renamed the East Division under the Boundaries Act 1868. The seat was created from parts of both South Essex and North Essex.

The place for "holding of courts for election of members" from 1867 became Braintree under the 1867 Act.

1868–1885: The Hundreds of Hinckford, Lexden, Tendring, Winstree, Witham, Thurstable, and Dengie.

The Dengie hundred was transferred from the Southern Division, with the remainder previously part of the abolished Northern division.

Under the Redistribution of Seats Act 1885, the three two-member divisions of Essex were abolished and replaced by eight single-member divisions. East Essex was replaced by the Harwich and Maldon Divisions and parts of the Saffron Walden and South Eastern Divisions.

Members of Parliament

Election results 

 

 

Brise's resignation caused a by-election.

References 

Specific

Parliamentary constituencies in Essex (historic)
Constituencies of the Parliament of the United Kingdom established in 1868
Constituencies of the Parliament of the United Kingdom disestablished in 1885